Statistics of the Scottish Football League in season 1933–34.

Scottish League Division One

Scottish League Division Two

See also
1933–34 in Scottish football

References

 
Scottish Football League seasons